Sigebertus or Sijvert Evert "Siwart" Haverkamp (14 December 1684, Leeuwarden - 25 April 1742, Leiden) was a Dutch classicist who published his first edition of Josephus in 1726. Thomas Jefferson owned a later edition.

References
Sowerby, E.M. Catalogue of the Library of Thomas Jefferson, 1952, v. 1, p. 4.

External links
CERL page

1684 births
1742 deaths
Dutch classical scholars
Academic staff of Leiden University
People from Leeuwarden